Robin Vik was the champion in 2009 but lost to Simon Greul in the second round.Martin Fischer defeated Cedrik-Marcel Stebe in the final 6–3, 6–4.

Seeds

Draw

Finals

Top half

Bottom half

References
Main Draw
Qualifying Singles

Oberstaufen Cup - Singles
Oberstaufen Cup